4-HO-MiPT (miprocin, 4-hydroxy-N-methyl-N-isopropyltryptamine) is a synthetic substituted aromatic compound and a lesser-known psychedelic tryptamine. It is thought to be a serotonergic psychedelic, similar to magic mushrooms, LSD and mescaline. Its molecular structure and pharmacological effects somewhat resemble those of the tryptamine psilocin, which is the primary psychoactive chemical in magic mushrooms.

History
4-HO-MiPT was presumably first synthesized by Alexander Shulgin. Its synthesis is described in his book TiHKAL along with reports by people who had ingested the compound. Shulgin's trials and other anecdotal information suggest that 4-HO-MiPT is a synthetic psychedelic similar in activity to psilocin. It is relatively uncommon and has only a short history of human use.

Chemistry
Miprocin is the 4-hydroxyl analog of the chemical N-methyl-N-isopropyltryptamine as well as the isopropyl homolog and possible structural analog of 4-HO-DMT.

In August 2019, Chadeayne et al. solved the crystal structure of 4-HO-MiPT fumarate. Its systematic name is [2-(4-hydroxy-1Hindol-3-yl)ethyl](methyl)propan-2-ylazanium 3-carboxyprop-2-enoate monohydrate. The salt consists of a protonated tryptammonium cation and a 3-carboxyacrylate (hydrogen fumarate) anion in the asymmetric unit along with a water molecule of crystallization.

Pharmacology
4-HO-MiPT is thought to be a serotonergic psychedelic. Like other serotonergic psychedelics, its method of action is believed to result from its partial agonism of 5-HT2A and 5-HT1A serotonin receptors.

Toxicity
Very little is known about the toxicity of 4-HO-MiPT. Its chemical structure and pharmacological activity are very similar to psilocin, a compound which isn't associated with compulsive use or physical dependence. However, because very little research has been done on 4-HO-MiPT, it cannot be definitively concluded that its pharmacological actions in the human body do not differ from those of psilocin. To date, there have been no reported deaths from 4-HO-MiPT.

Duration
Onset of action is 15 to 45 minutes and has a duration of 4 to 6 hours, depending on dose. The duration of action is one half-hour to two hours when injected IV.

Drug prohibition laws

Sweden
Sveriges riksdags health ministry Statens folkhälsoinstitut classified 4-HO-MiPT as "health hazard" under the act Lagen om förbud mot vissa hälsofarliga varor (translated Act on the Prohibition of Certain Goods Dangerous to Health) as of 1 November 2005, in regulation SFS 2005:733 listed as "4-hydroxi-N,N-metylisopropyltryptamin (4-HO-MIPT)", making it illegal to sell or possess.

United Kingdom
The substance could also be considered illegal in the UK under the Misuse of Drugs Act 1971.

United States
4-HO-MiPT is an unscheduled drug in the United States. However, it is arguably an analog of psilocin, which could lead to prosecution under the Federal Analog Act.

Russia
4-HO-MiPT is in Schedule 1 in Russia as an analog of 4-hydroxytryptamine.

See also 
 MiPT
 4-AcO-MiPT
 4-HO-McPT
 4-MeO-MiPT
 5-MeO-MiPT
 Dimethyltryptamine
 Psilocybin
 Metocin
 TiHKAL
 Psychedelic drug
 Psychoactive drug

References

External links 
 Erowid 4-HO-MiPT Vault
 4-HO-MIPT entry in TiHKAL
 4-HO-MIPT entry in TiHKAL • info

Designer drugs
Entheogens
Phenols
Psychedelic tryptamines
Serotonin receptor agonists
Isopropylamino compounds